| points             = {{#expr: 
 72+4+34+12+46+6+22+16+42+4
 + 46+74+34+4+92+18+26
 +92+6+20
 + 58 }}
| tries              = 157
| topscorer-flag     = England
| topscorer          = Tara-Jane Stanley 62 points (6 tries + 19 goals)
| top try scorer-flag= Australia
| top try scorer=  Julia Robinson
(7 tries)
| tournaments        = Women's Rugby League World Cup#Tournaments
| last               = 2017
| next               = 2025
|runnerup=New Zealand}}

The 2021 Women's Rugby League World Cup was the sixth staging of the Women's Rugby League World Cup, and was be one of three major tournaments part of the 2021 Rugby League World Cup. The tournament was held in England from 1 November to 19 November 2022. Originally planned for 2021, it was delayed a year along with the Men's and Wheelchair tournaments due to the COVID-19 pandemic. The tournament featured eight teams, an increase of two from the previous tournament.

For the first time the tournament had parity with the men's and wheelchair tournaments with all participants being paid the same while all 61 matches across three tournaments will be broadcast live.

Teams

Qualification
The competing teams were selected based on criteria including growth and current infrastructure and were announced on 18 July 2019.

Draw
The teams were drawn into two groups of four. The draw was made at Buckingham Palace on 16 January 2020. Teams from pool 1 were drawn by Prince Harry, Duke of Sussex, pool 2 was drawn by Katherine Grainger and pool 3 by Jason Robinson.

Ahead of the fixture list being announced, the organisers stated that there would be at least four days between a team's games in the interests of player welfare.

The fixtures were announced on 21 July 2020.  Following the postponement of the tournament from 2021 to 2022, a revised schedule was published on 21 November 2021. All the games in the tournament were played as double-headers with other games from either the women's or men's tournaments.

Squads

Each nation announced 24 player squads to compete in the tournament.

Venues

Stadiums
Five venues were used for the women's tournament. Stadiums are referred to by their official name rather than sponsored name, as is International Rugby League policy

Team base camp locations 
Two locations were used by the eight national team squads to stay and train before and during the World Cup tournament, as follows;
 Leeds: Brazil, Canada, England and Papua New Guinea
 York:  Australia, Cook Islands, France and New Zealand

Officiating

Match officials
The list of match officials who officiated across both the men's and women's tournaments was published on 5 October 2022.

  Grant Atkins (Australia)
  Kasey Badger (Australia)
  Dean Bowmer (England)
  Ben Casty (France)
  James Child (England)
  Darian Furner (Australia)
  Adam Gee (Australia)
  Tom Grant (England)
  Marcus Griffiths (England)
  Robert Hicks (England)
  Neil Horton (England)
  Chris Kendall (England)
  Ashley Klein (Australia)
  Aaron Moore (England)

  Liam Moore (England)
  Paki Parkinson (New Zealand)
  Geoffrey Poumes (France)
  Wyatt Raymond (Australia)
  Liam Rush (England)
  Belinda Sharpe (Australia)
  Michael Smaill (England)
  Jack Smith (England)
  Todd Smith (Australia)
  Gerard Sutton (Australia)
  Rochelle Tamarua (New Zealand)
  Ben Thaler (England)
  Warren Turley (England)
  James Vella (England)

Warm-up matches 
Pre-tournament practice matches took place in the weeks before the first round of group stage matches of the World Cup.

Group stage

Group A

Group B
All six of the Group B fixtures were played at the York Community Stadium in York.

Knockout stage

Semi-finals
The semi-finals were played as a double-header at the York Community Stadium, York on 14 November 2022.

Final

The final was played at Old Trafford, Manchester on 19 November 2022 as a double-header with the final of the men's tournament.

Team of the Tournament  
Between the Semi-finals and final the RLWC2021 organisers announced the team of the tournament.

See also
 2021 Men's Rugby League World Cup
 2021 Wheelchair Rugby League World Cup
 2021 Festival of World Cups
 Legacy of the 2021 Rugby League World Cup

Notes and references

Notes

References

External links

Women's Rugby League World Cup
Women's Rugby League World Cup
Women's Rugby League World Cup
International rugby league competitions hosted by the United Kingdom
Women's rugby league in England
Rugby League World Cup
Womens Rugby League World Cup, 2021
2021 in English rugby league
2021 in English women's sport
2021 in women's rugby league